Leyburn Airfield was a World War II airfield in Leyburn, Queensland.

History

Proposal for the construction of Leyburn Airfield to begin was proposed in March 1942. The Australian War Cabinet approved work to commence on 8 May 1942. The construction that followed of Leyburn Airfield early in the year 1942 was amidst World War II with the project's purpose to allow the area to facilitate the operation of US heavy bombers, in the event that the Japanese army were to invade the southeast of Queensland. This was done in the wake of the Battle of the Coral Sea. The airfield is located 37 kilometres from Toowoomba in the Darling Downs region of southeast Queensland.

All of Leyburn Airfield's facilities had been completed by April 1943, with a total infrastructure of buildings and services able to cater for 450 personnel. Leyburn Airfield post completion operated as an airbase for multiple RAAF squadrons until 200 Flight RAAF disbanded at the airfield in December 1945, resulting in the airfield's desertion.

The Airfield sat vacant for 2 years before the Australian Federal Government moved to have the site closed. This proposal was contested in 1947 by the Warwick City Council in addition to the Rosenthal, Allora and Glengallan Shire councils who launched a joint protest to save the airfield which had a construction cost of £1,500,000. The site closure was later further contested by the Pittsworth Shire Council in 1948, following the Department of Civil Aviation decision on classifying Leyburn Airfield as abandoned. The catalyst for the Federal Government's decision to close the site was based on their goal to sell the gravel that was on the runway.

In the year 1943, the Airfield in Leyburn was home to only 2 sealed runways set in the Darling Downs undulating countryside and by July was on a list of 17 unoccupied aerodromes situated within Queensland. The government had intended on the utilisation of taxiways to hideout areas. Out of the 16 that had been partly constructed, all were eventually abandoned. The northern ends of the two runways were connected by a sealed taxiway at an estimated width of 15.2m which accommodated a variety of aircraft despite its initial purpose of servicing only heavy bomber planes.

Leyburn Airfield was constructed without any accommodation buildings, only a mess hall and kitchen in addition to ablution facilities and latrines. The Airfield did not have any operational buildings on the site, nor any hangars, bomb stores or blast pens. The airfield had two  capacity underground petrol tanks which were installed by the middle of 1944.

In April 1944 the US Army claimed that the Leyburn Airfield was completely developed by the efforts and resources supplied by the RAAF, and thus was maintained, controlled, and operated by the RAAF. A map that was produced by the RAAF in June 1945 depicted a 138 degree runway that was a total of 5,350 feet long by 150 feet wide (approximately 1.63 km by 45.7m). In addition to another 36 degree runway that ran 7000 feet long by 150 feet wide (approximately 2.14 km by 45.7m). In 1945, the 138 degree runway was used solely for the parking of aircraft due to its poor condition. The 36 degree runway was in moderate condition. A gravelled taxiway that was in poor condition ran from the camp to the southern end of the 36 degree runway during the same time period.

Due to the poor condition of Leyburn Airfield, maintenance inspections had to be carried out by personnel from 14 Operational Base Unit (OBU) from a RAAF Station situated in Lowood in 1945. A Main Roads Board repair and maintenance party was stationed at the airfield between January and October 1945 in order to keep the runways at Leyburn serviceable.

The Airfield in Leyburn was host to many RAAF units between July 1944 and December 1945. The units consisted of 21 Squadron, 23 Squadron, 99 Squadron and 200 Special Duties Flight. All units stationed at Leyburn flew B-24 Liberator bombers. Both RAAF Squadrons 21 and 23 prior to B-24 Liberator bombers, flew Vultee Vengeance aircraft. RAAF Squadron 99 and 200 Special Duties Flight both in February 1945 formed at Leyburn Airfield.

By late in February 1945 the airfield in Leyburn was crowded with an estimated number of personnel on site between 1,000 to 1,300. RAAF Squadron 99 was eventually moved to Jondaryan in March 1945 due to the overcrowding. Soon after, 200 Special Duties Flight was the next RAAF unit to move and the last to leave Leyburn due to the overcrowding, disbanding in December 1945.

The Airfield remained, and in 1949 was host to the Australian Grand Prix.

References

Former Royal Australian Air Force bases
Airfields of the United States Army Air Forces in Australia
World War II airfields in Australia
Defunct airports in Queensland
Airports established in 1943
Australian Grand Prix
Motorsport venues in Queensland